Daniel Dravot (DRAV-it) is a fictional character in Rudyard Kipling's novella "The Man Who Would Be King" (1888) and its film adaptation. In the film, he is portrayed by Sean Connery. Robert Hutchinson in his biography of Frederick Wilson suggests that Pahari Wilson, the so-called Raja of Harsil, was the inspiration for Kipling's character.

In the short story
In the short story, Dravot and co-conspirator Peachey Carnehan are members of the Third Degree of Freemasonry. Travelling to Kafiristan (in modern Afghanistan) with the intention of becoming kings, the two make a very convenient discovery: the natives are in possession of the secrets of both the First and Second Degrees of Freemasonry, but not those of the Third Degree. Dravot puts on his Master Mason's apron, whereupon the natives recognise the Third Degree symbol as their own sacred symbol concealed on the bottom of a stone. As luck would (again) have it, the stone on which the symbol is engraved is the very stone upon which Dravot is then sitting. Dravot immediately declares himself "Grand Master of All Kafiristan" and also Co-King of Kafiristan along with Carnehan. The conspiracy is eventually discovered, which results in the death of Dravot. Carnehan is crucified between two trees and survives for a day. The natives see this and let him go. He later returns to India, finds the narrator of the story, and tells him what has happened.

Film adaptation
The film is very true to the short story, but goes into less masonic detail. The different degrees are not mentioned by name. The identification of Dravot as a supposed god is made by the fact that he wears a pendant bearing a symbol, which is the sacred symbol of the Kafir natives. The symbol used in the film is not named, but is clearly shown, and is simply the Square and Compasses symbol of Freemasonry.

Other works
In the English writer Kim Newman's novel Anno Dracula (1992), Dravot appears as a vampire who works for the Diogenes Club during the time Count Dracula rules Britain, and helps them hunt down Jack the Ripper. He reappears in the World War I-set sequel, The Bloody Red Baron. In the second sequel, Dracula Cha Cha Cha, Dravot is said to be the vampire father-in-darkness of Diogenes Club agent Hamish Bond (a reference to both characters being played by Sean Connery).

In the comics adaptation H. G. Wells' The War of the Worlds and Scarlet Traces by Ian Edginton and d'Israeli, Dravot works for Dr. Davenport Spry, an official of the British government preparing for a counter-invasion of Mars following the events of The War of the Worlds. In the sequel, Scarlet Traces: The Great Game, it is said that Dravot died in the first major battle in the invasion, the Siege of Tharsis Ridge. His son James is a major character.

References

External links
Details of Kipling's masonic career including a study of The Man Who Would Be King.

Fictional British people
Fictional con artists
Fictional soldiers
Literary characters introduced in 1888